Mohammed Rageh (born 1 January 1998) is a Yemeni middle-distance runner who competes in the 1500 metres. He represented his country at the 2016 Summer Olympics, competing in the heats only.

As a young athlete, he won a steeplechase bronze at the 2013 Asian Youth Games and participated in the junior race at the 2015 IAAF World Cross Country Championships.

International competitions

References

External links
 

Living people
1998 births
Yemeni male middle-distance runners
Olympic athletes of Yemen
Athletes (track and field) at the 2016 Summer Olympics